Sanaswadi (Marathi : सणसवाडी) is an industrial village. It is a part of Maharashtra Industrial Development Corporation (MIDC). Together this set up is called Sanaswadi-Shikrapur Industrial Belt.

Geography
The village is located approximately 30 km to the east of the city of Pune. Village located on Pune–Ahmednagar highway and well connected to nearby industrial & major cities.

References

Villages in Pune district